Tadeusz Górczyk (16 October 1961 – 21 December 2020) was a Polish politician who served as a Deputy.

References

1961 births
2020 deaths
Polish politicians